Slow Video is a 2014 South Korean comedy film written and directed by Kim Young-tak, starring Cha Tae-hyun and Nam Sang-mi.

It is the second Korean film to be fully financed by American studio 20th Century Fox.

Plot
Yeo Jang-boo possesses dynamic visual acuity, which enables him to visually discern fine detail in a moving object that ordinary people cannot, as if he's seeing the world in slow motion. Due to his special ability, Jang-boo has to constantly wear sunglasses, which made him a target of bullying at school and throughout his childhood. He spends 20 years isolated and alone, but his talent proves to be a gift later in life when he finally goes out into the world and ends up working at his neighbor's CCTV control center. One day while unenthusiastically watching passersby onscreen, he spots his first love Bong Soo-mi. Despite being terrible at social interactions, Jang-boo sets out to win her heart.

Cast
 Cha Tae-hyun as Yeo Jang-boo
 Nam Sang-mi as Bong Soo-mi
 Oh Dal-su as Byeong-soo
 Ko Chang-seok as Doctor Seok
 Jin Kyung as Old maid Shim
 Yooyoung as Yeo Jang-mi
 Kim Hyeon
 Kim Kang-hyeon as Sang-man 
 Jung Yun-seok as Kim Baek-goo
 Choi Seong-won as Loan shark
 Kwak Jin-moo as Director Mo
 Hwang Seung-eon as Heroine

Box office
The film was released on October 2, 2014. For its three-day opening weekend, Slow Video recorded 546,873 admissions and grossed , placing it second on the box office chart, behind Whistle Blower. It drew a total of 1.17 million admissions for the month of October.

References

External links 
  
 
 
 

2014 films
2010s Korean-language films
South Korean comedy films
Films shot in Gyeonggi Province
Films directed by Kim Young-tak
2010s South Korean films